De tre måske fire is a 1939 Danish family film directed by Lau Lauritzen Jr. and Alice O'Fredericks.

Cast
 Victor Borge as Kontorist
 Lau Lauritzen as Kontorist
 Poul Reichhardt as Kontorist
 Per Gundmann as Kontorist
 Børge Munch Petersen as Kontorchef
 Henry Gleditsch as Generaldirektør
 Betty Söderberg as Generaldirektørens forlovede
 Inge-Lise Rune as Generaldirektørens sekretær
 Erika Voigt as Generaldirektørens bogholderske
 Eigil Reimers as Generaldirektørens chauffør
 Gull-Maj Norin as En Svensk dame
 Gunnar Lauring as Hendes kompagnion
 Knud Almar as En gammel mand
 Sigurd Langberg as En tjener

References

External links

1939 films
1930s Danish-language films
Danish black-and-white films
Films directed by Lau Lauritzen Jr.
Films directed by Alice O'Fredericks